The Singing Saw at Christmastime is an album released by Julian Koster on October 7, 2008 by Merge. It features covers of popular Christmas songs played by Julian Koster on the singing saw.

Track listing
"The First Noel" - 2:26
"Frosty the Snowman" - 1:36
"Silent Night" - 2:18
"Santa Claus is Coming to Town" - 1:48
"Jingle Bells" - 2:41
"White Christmas" - 2:44
"Silver Bells" - 3:17
"Hark! The Herald Angels Sing" - 2:51
"O Come All Ye Faithful" - 1:25
"O Holy Night" - 4:16
"O Little Town of Bethlehem" - 1:44
"We Wish You a Merry Christmas" - 2:07

References

2008 Christmas albums
Merge Records albums
Julian Koster albums
Christmas albums by American artists